Ali Azam may refer to:
 Ali Azam (Comilla politician) (born 1959), Bangladesh Awami League politician
 Ali Azam (Barisal politician) (bonr 1972), Bangladesh Awami League politician

See also
 Azam Ali (born 1970), Iranian musician
 Azam Ali (scientist), Bangladeshi scientist